Mohsenabad (also Romanized as Moḩsenābād) is a village in Sarajuy-ye Sharqi Rural District, Saraju District, Maragheh County, East Azerbaijan Province, Iran. At the 2006 census, its population was 167, in 30 families.

References 

Towns and villages in Maragheh County